Calliteara lunulata is a moth of the family Erebidae. It is found in the Russian Far East, Japan, China and Taiwan.

The wingspan is 51–55 mm for males and 65–70 mm for females. Adults are on wing from May to June and from July to August in two generations per year.

The larvae feed on the leaves of various trees, including Quercus and Castanea species.

Subspecies
Calliteara lunulata lunulata
Calliteara lunulata takamukuana (Matsumura, 1927) (Taiwan)

References

Lymantriinae
Moths described in 1887
Moths of Asia
Moths of Japan
Moths of Taiwan